Jasmine Flury (born 16 September 1993) is a Swiss World Cup alpine ski racer, specializing in the speed events of Downhill  Flury won gold in downhill at the 2023 Alpine Ski World Championship.

Flury made her World Cup debut at age twenty in January 2014, and her first podium was a victory on home country snow, in a Super-G at St. Moritz in December 2017.  She has competed in three World Championships and two Winter Olympics.

World Cup results
Flury made her World Cup debut at age twenty in a downhill at Altenmarkt in January 2014, but had only one additional start that season, with over twenty on the European Cup circuit.  The next season she had eight World Cup starts but went without a top thirty result, and concurrently raced in European Cup events. A hip injury kept her out of the 2016 season.

Season standings
{| class=wikitable style="text-align:center"
! Season
! Age
! Overall
! Slalom
! Giantslalom
! Super-G
! Downhill
! Combined
|-
| 2015 || 21 || — || — || — || — || — || —
|-
| 2016 || 22 || colspan=6 |
|-
| 2017 ||23|| 42 || — || — ||22 || 21 || —
|-
| 2018 ||24|| 24 || — || — ||13 || 15 || —
|-
| 2019 ||25|| 29 || — || — ||10 || 19 || —
|-
| 2020 ||26|| 66 || — || — ||29 || 34 || —
|-
| 2021 ||27|| 35 || — || — ||32 || 13 || rowspan="3" 
|-
| 2022 ||28||26||— ||—||15||17
|-
| 2023 ||29||31||—||—||18||11|}

Race podiums
 1 win – (1 SG)
 2 podiums – (1 DH, 1 SG); 24 top tens (14 DH, 10 SG)

World Championship results

Olympic results

References

External links
 
 
 Swiss Ski team – Jasmine Flury –  Stoeckli skis – Jasmine Flury
  – ''

1993 births
Living people
Swiss female alpine skiers
Alpine skiers at the 2018 Winter Olympics
Alpine skiers at the 2022 Winter Olympics
Olympic alpine skiers of Switzerland
People from Davos
Sportspeople from Graubünden
21st-century Swiss women